Patio Bullrich is an important shopping center in the Retiro section of Buenos Aires.

Overview
Designed by English Argentine architect Juan Waldorp, Patio Bullrich was originally built as an auction house in 1867 for the prominent local Bullrich family.  The auction house was long one of the city's premier sales floors for livestock, particularly prize bulls, and thoroughbreds, as well as serving as a consignment house for a variety of valuable heirlooms and other collectible items.

The upscale area's rising real estate values prompted the Bullrich family to sell the acre-size Avenida del Libertador lot to Alto Palermo, S.A., a leading local commercial real estate developer during the mid-1980s. Alto Palermo commissioned Pfeifer & Zurdo Architects to convert the cavernous building into a shopping center. Designing a six-story arcade they maintained some of the original aspects of Waldorp's design, including a massive clock tower numerous marble animal head wall sculptures and the neoclassical façade.

Inaugurated in August 1988, Patio Bullrich was the first of a series of new upscale shopping galleries opened in subsequent years to replace aging favorites, and pre-dated Galerías Pacífico, the better-known shopping center likewise built in a historic building, by three years. Modernized and expanded in 1995, Patio Bullrich used to house numerous international luxury brands, including Carolina Herrera, Christian Dior, Christian Lacroix and Tiffany & Co. There was also a stagecraft gift shop run by the Colón Theatre Foundation and four cinemas. However, many luxury brands have been forced to abandon the Argentine market due to government's import restrictions.

Several luxury brands have expressed interest of returning to Argentina after President Mauricio Macri's government intended to relax import restrictions. Italian luxury fashion house Ermenegildo Zegna reopened a store in Patio Bullrich in 2017. Swiss company Bally plans to establish a shop through local partnership. In 2018, Louis Vuitton announced that the company would return to Buenos Aires with a pop-up store in Patio Bullrich after exiting Argentina in 2012.

References and external links

Shopping malls in Buenos Aires
Commercial buildings completed in 1867
Shopping malls established in 1988
1867 establishments in Argentina